John Little McClellan (February 25, 1896 – November 28, 1977) was an American lawyer and a segregationist politician. A member of the Democratic Party, he served as a U.S. Representative (1935–1939) and a U.S. Senator (1943–1977) from Arkansas.

At the time of his death, he was the second most senior member of the Senate and chairman of the Senate Appropriations Committee. He is the longest-serving senator in Arkansas history.

Early life and career
John Little McClellan was born on a farm near Sheridan, Arkansas to Isaac Scott and Belle (née Suddeth) McClellan. His parents, who were strong Democrats, named him after John Sebastian Little, who served as a U.S. Representative (1894–1907) and Governor of Arkansas (1907). His mother died only months after his birth, and he received his early education at local public schools. At age 12, after graduating from Sheridan High School, he began studying law in his father's office.

He was admitted to the state bar in 1913, when he was only 17, after the Arkansas General Assembly approved a special act waiving the normal age requirement for certification as a lawyer. As the youngest attorney in the United States, he practiced law with his father in Sheridan.

McClellan married Eula Hicks in 1913; the couple had two children, and divorced in 1921. During World War I, he served in the U.S. Army as a first lieutenant in the aviation section of the Signal Corps from 1917 to 1919. Following his military service, he moved to Malvern, where he opened a law office and served as city attorney (1920–26).

In 1922, he married Lucille Smith, to whom he remained married until her death in 1935; they had three children. He was prosecuting attorney of the seventh judicial district of Arkansas from 1927 to 1930.

U.S. House of Representatives
In 1934, McClellan was elected as a Democrat to the U.S. House of Representatives from Arkansas's 6th congressional district. He was re-elected to the House in 1936. In March of that year, he condemned CBS for airing a speech by Communist leader Earl Browder, which he described as "nothing less than treason."

During his tenure in the House, he voted against President Franklin D. Roosevelt's court-packing plan, the Gavagan anti-lynching bill, and the Reorganization Act of 1937. In 1937, he wed for the third and final time, marrying Norma Myers Cheatham.

In 1938, McClellan unsuccessfully challenged first-term incumbent Hattie Caraway for the Democratic nomination for the United States Senate. During the campaign, he criticized Caraway for her support for the 1937 Reorganization Act and accused her of having "improper influence" over federal employees in Arkansas. Nevertheless, he was defeated in the primary election by a margin of about 8,000 votes. He subsequently resumed the practice of law in Camden, where he joined the firm Gaughan, McClellan and Gaughan. He served as a delegate to the Democratic National Convention in 1940 (Chicago), 1944 (Chicago), and 1948 (Philadelphia).

U.S. Senate
In 1942, after G. Lloyd Spencer decided not to seek re-election, McClellan ran for the Senate again and this time won. He served as senator from Arkansas from 1943 to 1977, when he died in office. During his tenure, he served as chairman of the Appropriations Committee and served 22 years as chairman of the Committee on Government Operations. McClellan was the longest serving United States Senator in Arkansas history. During the later part of his Senate service, Arkansas had, perhaps, the most powerful Congressional delegations with McClellan as chairman of the Senate Appropriations Committee, Wilbur Mills as chairman of the House Ways and Means Committee, Oren Harris as chairman of the House Commerce Committee, Senator J. William Fulbright as chairman of the Senate Foreign Relations Committee, Took Gathings as chairman of the House Agriculture Committee, and James William Trimble as a member of the powerful House Rules Committee.

McClellan also served for eighteen years as chairman of the Senate Permanent Subcommittee on Investigations (1955–73) and continued the hearings into subversive activities at U.S. Army Signal Corps, Fort Monmouth, New Jersey, where Soviet spies Julius Rosenberg, Al Sarant and Joel Barr all worked in the 1940s. He was a participant in the famous Army-McCarthy Hearings and led a Democratic walkout of that subcommittee in protest of Senator Joseph McCarthy's conduct in those hearings.

McClellan appeared in the 2005 movie Good Night, and Good Luck in footage from the actual hearings. McClellan led two other investigations which were both televised uncovering spectacular law-breaking and corruption. The first, under the United States Senate Select Committee on Improper Activities in Labor and Management, also known as the McClellan Committee, investigated union corruption and centered on Jimmy Hoffa and lasted from January 1957 to March 1960.

In April 1961, during a Senate Investigations Committee hearing, contractor Henry Gable asserted that Communists would not be able to do the same amount of damage to the American missile effort as done by labor at Cape Canaveral. McClellan suggested that the comments bordered on subversion and called for more testimony from the unions.

The second in 1964, known as the Valachi hearings, investigated the operations of organized crime and featured the testimony of Joseph Valachi, the first American mafia figure to testify about the activities of organized crime. He continued his efforts against organized crime, supplying the political influence for the anti-organized crime law Racketeer Influenced and Corrupt Organizations Act (RICO) until 1973 when he switched to investigating political subversion. During this period, he hired Robert F. Kennedy as chief counsel and vaulted him into the national spotlight. He investigated numerous cases of government corruption including numerous defense contractors and Texas financier Billie Sol Estes.

In 1956, McClellan was one of 82 representatives and 19 senators who signed the Southern Manifesto in opposition to the 1954 U.S. Supreme Court decision Brown v. Board of Education and racial integration.

One of McClellan's law partners prior to his Senate service, Maud Crawford, went missing in March 1957 in Camden, Arkansas. There had been speculation that she had been kidnapped by the Mafia in an attempt to intimidate McClellan, but no ransom note was ever forthcoming. The disappearance, which remains unsolved, received international attention.

However, in 1986 the local paper ran a series of articles suggesting that she was killed as she was obstructing the attempt by another partner in McClellan's law firm to subvert the will of one of her clients. It is unclear whether McClellan would have been aware of this matter although, since it involved matters of legal ethics and a $15m will it is probable that he was at least aware of the dispute. If so he was complicit in hiding this matter until his death. 
In 1957, McClellan opposed U.S. President Dwight D. Eisenhower's decision to send federal troops to enforce the desegregation of Central High School in Little Rock. Prior to the sending of the troops under the command of Major General Edwin A. Walker, McClellan had expressed "regret [regarding] the ... use of force by the federal government to enforce integration. I believe it to be without authority of law. I am very apprehensive that such action may precipitate more trouble than it will prevent."

McClellan and fellow Senator Robert S. Kerr of Oklahoma were the sponsors of the bill that authorized construction of the McClellan-Kerr Arkansas River Navigation System, maintained by the Army Corps of Engineers. The system transformed the once-useless Arkansas River into a major transportation route and water source.

Although his Select Committee on Improper Activities in Labor and Management had already been dissolved by 1960, McClellan began a related three-year investigation in 1963 through the Permanent Investigations Senate Subcommittee into the union benefit plans of labor leader George Barasch, alleging misuse and diversion of $4,000,000 of benefit funds.

McClellan's notable failure to find any legal wrongdoing led to his introduction of several pieces of new legislation including his own bill on October 12, 1965 setting new fiduciary standards for plan trustees. Senator Jacob K. Javits (R-NY) introduced bills in 1965 and 1967 increasing regulation on welfare and pension funds to limit the control of plan trustees and administrators. Provisions from all three bills ultimately evolved into the guidelines enacted in the Employee Retirement Income Security Act of 1974 (ERISA).

In his last Senate election in 1972, McClellan defeated fellow Democrat David Hampton Pryor, then a U.S. representative, by a narrow 52-48 percent margin in the party runoff. He then defeated the only Republican who ever ran against him, Wayne H. Babbitt, then a North Little Rock veterinarian, by a margin of 61-39 percent. Pryor was elected to the seat in 1978, three weeks before the first anniversary of McClellan's death.

In 1974, McClellan informed President Gerald R. Ford, Jr., that he would not support the renomination of Republican Lynn A. Davis as U.S. marshal for the Eastern District of Arkansas based in Little Rock. McClellan claimed that Davis, who as the temporary head of the Arkansas state police had conducted sensational raids against mobsters in Hot Springs, was too partisan for the position. In an effort to appease the powerful McClellan, Ford moved to replace Davis with Len E. Blaylock of Perry County, the mild-mannered Republican gubernatorial nominee in the 1972 campaign against Dale Bumpers.

In 1977, McClellan was one of five Democrats to vote against the nomination of F. Ray Marshall as United States Secretary of Labor.

Personal life
McClellan's second wife died of spinal meningitis in 1935 and his son Max died of the same disease in 1943 while serving in Africa during World War II. His son, John L. Jr., died in 1949 in an automobile accident, and his son James H. died in a plane crash in 1958. Both men were members of the Xi chapter of Kappa Sigma fraternity at the University of Arkansas. To honor their two fallen brothers, the Chapter initiated Senator McClellan into Kappa Sigma in 1965.

McClellan died in his sleep on November 28, 1977, in Little Rock, Arkansas, following surgery to implant a pacemaker. He was buried at Roselawn Memorial Park in Little Rock. A VA Hospital in Little Rock is named in his honor. Ouachita Baptist University is the repository for his official papers.

See also
 List of United States Congress members who died in office (1950–1999)

References

External links

 Congressional Biographical Directory.
 The Man Behind The Frown TIME Magazine Story Of Senator John McClellan, May 27, 1957
 TV.com's Episode Guide for "What's My Line" - Episode 245 with Senator John McClellan as mystery guest.
 Fearless: John L. McClellan, United States Senator - Official biography.

1896 births
1977 deaths
Arkansas lawyers
People from Camden, Arkansas
People from Sheridan, Arkansas
Politicians from Little Rock, Arkansas
Sheridan High School (Arkansas) alumni
United States Army officers
Democratic Party United States senators from Arkansas
Democratic Party members of the United States House of Representatives from Arkansas
20th-century American politicians
Lawyers from Little Rock, Arkansas
20th-century American lawyers
United States Army personnel of World War I
Old Right (United States)
American anti-communists